Ryan Mahuta (born 7 July 2002) is a professional footballer who plays as a left-back for Veikkausliiga side Haka.

Career
On 20 January 2023, Mahuta signed a one-year contract with Haka, with an option to extend for 2024.

Career statistics

Club

Notes

References

2002 births
Finnish people of Democratic Republic of the Congo descent
Living people
Finnish footballers
Association football defenders
Turun Palloseura footballers
FC Inter Turku players
FC Haka players
Veikkausliiga players